N22 may refer to:

Roads
 N22 road (Belgium), a National Road in Belgium
 Route nationale 22, in France
 N22 road (Ireland)
 Nebraska Highway 22, in the United States

Other uses
 N22 (Long Island bus)
 Atlas V N22, an American expendable launch system
 GAF N22 Nomad, an Australian utility aircraft
 London Buses route N22
 Nitrogen-22 an isotope of nitrogen
 Sky Manor Airport (North Carolina), serving Jacksonville, North Carolina, United States
 N22, a postcode district in the N postcode area